AIHS may refer to:
Australian Institute of Health and Safety Melbourne, Australia 
 Ace Institute of Health Sciences, Pakistan
 American Irish Historical Society
 Australian International Hotel School, Canberra, Australia
 International Academy of the History of Science